The term anthropic unit (from Greek άνθρωπος meaning human) is used with different meanings in archaeology, in measurement and in social studies.

In archaeology
In archaeology, anthropic units are strata, or deposits of material containing a high proportion of man-made detritus. For example:

In measurement
Following the coinage of the term "anthropic principle" by Brandon Carter in 1973–4, units of measurement that are on a human scale are occasionally referred to as "anthropic units", as for example here:

In social studies
In fields of study such as sociology and ethnography, anthropic units are identifiable groupings of people. For example: 
and:

See also
 Anthropic principle
 Anthropocentrism
 List of human-based units of measurement

References

Measurement
Social concepts
Archaeological terminology
History of measurement